The Royal Victorian Medal (RVM) is a decoration established by Queen Victoria in April 1896. On 14 May 1912, King George V further confirmed the institution of the medal with an additional royal warrant. A part of the Royal Victorian Order, it is a reward for personal service to the Sovereign or the royal family, and is the personal gift of the sovereign. It differs from other grades of the order in appearance and in the way it is worn.

The medal has three levels: Bronze, Silver and Gold (silver gilt). Bars may be awarded to each level of Medal to denote subsequent awards. Recipients may continue to wear their original medal if they are awarded a higher level for further service. The medal may also be worn in addition to the badge of the Royal Victorian Order if this is later given to them.

Recipients are entitled to use the post-nominal letters RVM.

History
In creating the Royal Victorian Order in 1896, Queen Victoria decided to make a medal a part of the order as well. This medal would be used to reward those who had rendered faithful service to the monarch and the royal family, but were not eligible to be appointed to any orders due to their position or class. This creation followed the precedent of other European monarchs who had royal household medals with which to reward servants. The first medals were received 7 July 1896 and were presented to Russians by the Duke of Connaught while he was in Russia for the coronation of Tsar Nicholas II.

The medal has been historically used to recognise the service of police officers who work in protective services, gardeners, housekeepers, drivers, valets and other similar type staff. Non-commissioned members of the military may also be awarded the medal for services. The medal is often awarded for service to the monarch and royal family during royal visits. The medal may be looked upon as a long service medal, but the service must be of a meritorious character to warrant its award.

Originally ranked near the end, the medal now ranks ahead of campaign, jubilee, efficiency, and long service medals in the United Kingdom Order of Wear. This gradual increase in importance was marked by the July 1980 approval, by Queen Elizabeth II, to allow the use of the postnominal RVM by recipients of the medal.

Description
The medal is circular, 28 mm in diameter, struck in bronze, silver, and silver-gilt for gold medals.  The obverse bears the young effigy of Queen Elizabeth II. Surrounding the effigy is the inscription Elizabeth II Dei Gratia Regina F D. The reverse depicts the royal cypher, surrounded by a wreath or ribbons and laurel leaves. A curled ribbon at the bottom bears the inscription, Royal Victorian Medal.

Attached by a ring suspension, the medal is borne by a blue ribbon with thin stripes of white and red on each edge. Awards to foreigners have a white central stripe. The ribbon is the same as that of the Royal Victorian Order. Additional awards of the medal are indicated by bars attached to the ribbon.

Precedence
Some orders of precedence are as follows:

See also
Royal Victorian Chain

References

External links
Governor General of Canada site about the RVM

 
Civil awards and decorations of the United Kingdom
Long and Meritorious Service Medals of Britain and the Commonwealth